Oravisalo is an island in Rääkkylä, in Eastern Finland Province, Finland. Oravisalo is also a village in this island that covers an area of 49 km^2. It is 9th biggest freshwater island in Finland. Population is about 250.

Village
Hernevaara
Oravisalo

References 
 Maija-Liisa Tuomi: Suur-Liperin historia 
 Pekka Kauppinen: Pitäjä rajojen mailla 
 Suomen Kuvalehti: Näe ja koe Suomi

Lake islands of Finland
Villages in Finland